Gainesville Times can refer to:

 The Gainesville Sun, formerly The Gainesville Times, a Gainesville, Florida, newspaper
 The Gainesville Times (Georgia), a newspaper in Gainesville, Georgia